Pulloli Thomas Chacko (9 April 1915 – 31 July 1964), was an Indian politician from Chamampathal,Kottayam in central Kerala. A member of the Travancore and Travancore-Cochin Assemblies and the Constituent Assembly, Chacko served as the first Leader of Opposition of the newly formed state of Kerala (Namboodiripad ministry). He was also the Home Minister of Kerala holding the additional portfolios of Revenue and Law during the period 196064 (Pillai and Sankar ministries). Resignation of Chacko from Congress-led cabinet in 1964 resulted in the formation of the regional party Kerala Congress.

Early life
P. T. Chacko was born on 9 April 1915 to Thomas and Annamma of the Pulloli family at Chamampathal in Kottayam, Travancore. He was married to Mariamma and was survived by six children. 

Chacko graduated from St. Joseph's College, Trichy, the University of Madras after studying in St. Berchmans College Changanassery. He continued his studies in law in Government Law College, Thiruvananthapuram, where as a student leader in 1938, he participated in the anti-colonial struggle and in the agitation against princely state of Travancore.

Political career

In Travancore 
P. T. Chacko was chosen as President, Kottayam D. C. C. in 1945. He served as a member of Travancore Legislative Assembly from 1948 to 1949. After the integration of the states of Travancore and Cochin, he served as a member of the Travancore-Cochin Legislative Assembly from 1949 to 1952. Chacko was also the first Member of Parliament (1952–53) from Meenachil Constituency.

In 1949, Chacko was elected to the Constituent Assembly of India. 

He was the Chief Whip, Indian National Congress, the Travancore Legislative Assembly in 1948, and also acted as Secretary, Congress Legislature Party, Travancore Legislative Assembly.

In Kerala politics 
P. T. Chacko was elected to the first Kerala Legislative Assembly from Vazhoor Constituency in 1957 and became the first Leader of Opposition of the newly formed state of Kerala. He later played a significant role in the Liberation Struggle against the Communist government in Kerala.

He represented Meenachil Constituency in the second Kerala Legislative Assembly and handled the portfolio of Home Affairs, Revenue and Law in the coalition ministry headed by Praja Socialist Party leader Pattom Thanu Pillai from 22 February 1960 to 26 September 1962. In the subsequent cabinet headed by Congress leader R. Sankar, he handled the same portfolios from 26 September 1962 to 20 February 1964. He resigned from the post of Home and Revenue Minister on 20 February 1964. He was defeated in the contest for KPCC presidency in June 1964. 

Chacko returned to his law practice and continued to work for the Congress Party. The political career ended abruptly when he succumbed to a heart attack on 31 July 1964 at the age of 49. As a defense lawyer, he was visiting a scene of crime in Pulappara Mala in Thottilpalam, Kozhikode District.

Legacy 
After the death of P. T. Chacko, the Chacko supporters in the Congress Party grouped together and formed the regional party Kerala Congress under the leadership of K. M. George and with the blessings of the Catholic Church and the Nair community leader Mannath Padmanabhan.

P. C. Thomas 
P. C. Thomas, son of Chacko, represented the Muvattupuzha Parliamentary Constituency in Lok Sabha from 1989 to 2009, and also served as the Union Minister of State for Law in the National Democratic Alliance cabinet.

References 

1915 births
1964 deaths
India MPs 1952–1957
Indian independence activists from Kerala
Indian National Congress politicians from Kerala
Kerala MLAs 1957–1959
Leaders of the Opposition in Kerala
Lok Sabha members from Kerala
Members of the Constituent Assembly of India
Travancore–Cochin MLAs 1949–1952
Politicians from Kottayam
Politicians from Thiruvananthapuram
Ministers of states and union territories of India
Government Law College, Thiruvananthapuram alumni